Hardisty is a surname. Notable people with the surname include:

Alan Hardisty (born 1941), British rugby league footballer
Bob Hardisty (1921–1986), British footballer 
Charles Hardisty (1885–1968), British cricketer
Dorothy Hardisty (1881-1973), English champion of refugee children
Huntington Hardisty (1929–2003), American admiral
Jean Hardisty (1945–2015), American political scientist 
Richard Hardisty (1831–1889), Canadian politician
Sarah Hardisty (1924–2014), Dene elder and quillworker

See also
Hardisty family, Canadian family of British heritage